Dan Musa is a Local Government Area in Katsina State, Nigeria. Its headquarters are in the town of Dan Musa.

It has an area of 792 km and a population of 113,691 at the 2006 census.

The postal code of the area is 821.

References

Local Government Areas in Katsina State